5'-AMP-activated protein kinase subunit gamma-1 is an enzyme that in humans is encoded by the PRKAG1 gene.

Function 

The protein encoded by this gene is a regulatory subunit of the AMP-activated protein kinase (AMPK). AMPK is a heterotrimer consisting of an alpha catalytic subunit, and non-catalytic beta and gamma subunits. AMPK is an important energy-sensing enzyme that monitors cellular energy status. In response to cellular metabolic stresses, AMPK is activated, and thus phosphorylates and inactivates acetyl-CoA carboxylase (ACC) and beta-hydroxy beta-methylglutaryl-CoA reductase (HMGCR), key enzymes involved in regulating de novo biosynthesis of fatty acid and cholesterol. This subunit is one of the gamma regulatory subunits of AMPK. Alternatively spliced transcript variants encoding distinct isoforms have been observed.

Interactions 

PRKAG1 has been shown to interact with PRKAB2 and PRKAB1.

References

Further reading

External links 
 PDBe-KB provides an overview of all the structure information available in the PDB for Human 5'-AMP-activated protein kinase subunit gamma-1 (PRKAG1)

EC 2.7.11